Dumri is a village in the Dumri CD block in the Chainpur subdivision of the Gumla district in the Indian state of Jharkhand.

Geography

Location                          
Dumri is located at

Area overview 
The map alongside presents a rugged area, consisting partly of flat-topped hills called pat and partly of an undulating plateau, in the south-western portion of Chota Nagpur Plateau. Three major rivers – the Sankh, South Koel and North Karo - along with their numerous tributaries, drain the area. The hilly area has large deposits of Bauxite. 93.7% of the population lives in rural areas.

Note: The map alongside presents some of the notable locations in the district. All places marked in the map are linked in the larger full screen map.

Civic administration 
There is a police station at Dumri.

The headquarters of Dumri CD block are located at Dumri village.

Demographics 
According to the 2011 Census of India, Dumri had a total population of 4,048, of which 1,998 (49%) were males and 2,050 (51%) were females. Population in the age range 0–6 years was 624. The total number of literate persons in Dumri was 2,571 (75.09% of the population over 6 years).

(*For language details see Dumri, Gumla#Language and religion)

Education
Dumri College is affiliated with Ranchi University. Established in 1990, it has facilities for teaching in classes XI and XII.

Government High School Dumri Tangardih is a Hindi-medium coeducational institution established in 1961. It has facilities for teaching from class VIII to class XII. The school has a playground and a library with 498 books.

Kasturba Gandhi Balika Vidyalaya is a Hindi-medium girls only institution established in 2007. It has facilities for teaching from class VI to class XII. The school has a playground, a library with 645 books and has 5 computers for learning and teaching purposes.

Project Girls High School is a Hindi-medium girls only institution established in 1982. It has facilities for teaching from class VIII to class X. It has a playground and a library with 529 books.

References 

Villages in Gumla district